Edge of Alaska is an American reality television series. The series premiered on October 24, 2014, on Discovery Channel. There were 4 series of 8 episodes each, ending in 2017. The series follows the residents of McCarthy, Alaska.

When the show first started, the Anchorage Daily News reported on controversies: "A new Discovery Channel reality show set in McCarthy is drawing fire for heavy-handed treatment of the reviving old mining town's dark past and alleged outlaw reputation."

Synopsis 
IMDB summarizes Edge of Alaska as:

Neil Darish 

Neil Darish is a McCarthy resident who was involved in creation of, and appeared as a main character in, Edge of Alaska. He did interviews, about McCarthy and about the making of show, with Hollywood Soapbox, 
and the YouTube channel The Loud Spot. 

In the YouTube interview, Darish said about the show: 

Darish said the show was what he called "scene scripted": the producers would decide on the particular story to be portrayed, where a scene would take place, and what would happen in the scene. Mostly, the producers would not decide on the actual words to be used.

Also, Darish's views were included in an Aljazeera America article about film crews in Alaska:

Episodes

Series overview

Season 1 (2014)

Season 2 (2015)

Season 3 (2016)

Season 4 (2017)

References

External links
 

2010s American reality television series
2014 American television series debuts
2017 American television series endings
Discovery Channel original programming
Television shows set in Alaska